Echinocodon is a genus  of plants in the family Campanulaceae. There is only one known species, Echinocodon lobophyllus, endemic to the Chinese Province of Hubei.

References

External links

Campanuloideae
Flora of Hubei
Monotypic Campanulaceae genera